Middle Park may refer to:

Australia 
Middle Park, Queensland, a suburb of Brisbane in Australia
Middle Park, Victoria, a suburb of Melbourne in Australia
Middle Park (stadium), a former football (soccer) stadium located in Melbourne, Australia
Middle Park light rail station, Melbourne

United Kingdom 

 Middle Park, a district in the Birmingham ward of Weoley
 Middle Park, London, an area and housing estate of Eltham in the London Borough of Greenwich
 Middle Park, County Antrim, a townland in County Antrim, Northern Ireland
 Middle Park Stakes, a Group 1 flat horse race in Great Britain

United States 
Middle Park (Colorado basin), a valley in the Rocky Mountains in north-central Colorado in the United States
Middle Park, a park located in Algonquin in the videogame Grand Theft Auto IV based on Central Park in Manhattan, New York City